Samantha Isler (born October 26, 1998) is an American actress. She starred as Ellie in the NBC sitcom Sean Saves the World. Isler started her career in 2009, where she took part in NBC's Today as a kid reporter. She then played the role of teenage Amara/The Darkness on The CW series Supernatural.

Filmography

Film

Television

References

External links
 

Living people
1998 births
21st-century American actresses
Actresses from Tulsa, Oklahoma
American child actresses
American film actresses
American television actresses
Place of birth missing (living people)